Teresa is a Mattel fashion doll who is marketed as one of Barbie's fictional friends.  Teresa debuted in the "California Dream Teresa" doll in 1988 and since then, she has been Barbie's most frequently featured female companion in the toy line (next to Christie). As of 2006, Teresa has been one of Barbie's core friends in the Barbie brand along with Summer, Nikki and Raquelle.

In a trailer for the 2008 movie Barbie and the Diamond Castle, the narrator describes Teresa as Barbie's best friend. In the film itself, Barbie states that Teresa is officially her "best friend and sidekick." In Life in the Dreamhouse Barbie states that all girls Teresa, Nikki, Summer, Midge, Raquelle & Grace are all her 'BFFs.'

History 
To counteract the criticisms that Barbie was a sex symbol, Mattel was compelled to issue companions for Barbie. Some of these are her boyfriend Ken, the African American Christie, Barbie's cousin Francie and Barbie's little sister Skipper. Midge appeared in 1963 and was marketed as Barbie's first best friend. Midge was discontinued in 1967.

Over the years, Barbie's family tree expanded and soon Barbie would have many diverse and multicultural friends. Among these was Teresa, who was depicted as being Italian or Latina. She appeared in 1988 in the California Dream line alongside Barbie, Ken, Christie and Midge (who made her comeback in this line as well). Christie has been Barbie's most featured friend at the time, being continuously in the playline since 1968. It wasn't till 2004 when Christie was discontinued (her last appearance was in the Really Rosy line) then Teresa would become Barbie's most frequent companion to date (aside from Ken). 

Teresa has been seen in various Barbie-related media such as books, magazines, video games and movies such as Barbie & the Diamond Castle, Barbie and the Three Musketeers, Barbie: A Fashion Fairytale and Barbie: Life in the Dreamhouse.

Teresa has also appeared on a toy telephone, voiced by Mary Kay Bergman.

Personality Traits

According to Barbie, Teresa is a brilliant cook and one of her favorite activities is to make muffins. According to Teresa's B Friends profile, she has made 3,120 cupcakes to date; she has also rescued 36 stray animals. 

Teresa also likes to spend her free time reading gossip magazines about celebrities. She enjoys shopping at flea markets. Teresa states that her likes are "baking cupcakes, good karma, vintage clothing stores, tall waves at the beach, tall boys at the beach!"

Film

Residence

Teresa lives in Malibu, California in "Casa de Teresa" in the fictional "Barbie World". She is a neighbor of both Barbie and Ryan, as "Casa de Teresa" is located at the left side of "The Barbie Dreamhouse" and the right side of "The Ryan Mansion".

See also
Mickey Mouse Clubhouse

Notes and references

1980s toys
Products introduced in 1988
2000s toys
2010s toys
Barbie
Fictional fashion designers
 Fictional Hispanic and Latino American people